Rhodacra pyrrhocrossa is a moth of the family Tortricidae. It is found in Thailand, Japan, Taiwan, India and Australia.

The forewings are fuscous, although the apical halves of the scales are pale. The hindwings are blackish purple.

References

Moths described in 1912
Olethreutini
Moths of Japan